The Mount Richmond National Park is a national park located in the Barwon South West region of Victoria, Australia. Part of the route of the Great South West Walk is located within the park.

See also

 Great South West Walk
 Protected areas of Victoria

References

Naracoorte woodlands
National parks of Victoria (Australia)
Protected areas established in 1960
1960 establishments in Australia
Parks of Barwon South West (region)